Matter is a cancelled video game for the Xbox 360. It would have used the Kinect peripheral. It was originally announced at E3 2012; the game was set in a universe similar to that of Tron, with futuristic, industrial graphics, and featured small, metallic balls as the main characters. Originally, filmmaker Gore Verbinski, director of Pirates of the Caribbean and Rango, was attached to the project.

The game was announced to be cancelled about a year later. While reasons for the cancellation are unknown, a poster on the NeoGAF forums hinted at mismanagement and the studio's unfamiliarity of game development as the main problem.

References

Cancelled Xbox 360 games
Microsoft games
Kinect games